"Medical Love Song" is a Monty Python comedy song composed by Eric Idle and  John Du Prez, with  lyrics co-written by Graham Chapman. It appeared on Monty Python's Contractual Obligation Album from 1980, and is also included on the CD Monty Python Sings.

The song consists of a long list of sexually transmitted diseases contracted during a "lovely night in June" and their unpleasant effects on the body, using medical terminology provided by Graham Chapman, who was a qualified doctor.

The song was included as an animated number in A Liar's Autobiography, during the end credits.

References 

Monty Python songs
Mass media portrayals of STDs
Songs written by Eric Idle
Songs about diseases and disorders
Black comedy music
Songs written by John Du Prez